John Spencer (13 May 1708 – 19 June 1746) was a British nobleman and politician who sat in the House of Commons from 1732 to 1746.

Early life
Spencer was born on 13 May 1708 and was the youngest son of the 3rd Earl of Sunderland, the First Lord of the Treasury and Lord President of the Council under George I, and his second wife, Lady Anne Churchill, who served as Lady of the Bedchamber to Queen Anne from 1702 to 1712.  From his father's first marriage to Lady Arabella Cavendish, daughter of the 2nd Duke of Newcastle, he was a half brother to Lady Frances Spencer, the wife of the 4th Earl of Carlisle.  From his parents' marriage, his older full siblings were: Robert Spencer, who died young; Robert Spencer, 4th Earl of Sunderland; Lady Anne Spencer, who married Viscount Bateman; Charles Spencer, 5th Earl of Sunderland, who succeeded their aunt, Henrietta Godolphin, 2nd Duchess of Marlborough, as 3rd Duke of Marlborough.  His younger sister, Lady Diana Spencer, married the 4th Duke of Bedford.

His paternal grandparents were Robert Spencer, 2nd Earl of Sunderland, and Lady Anne Digby, daughter of George Digby, 2nd Earl of Bristol.  His mother was the third daughter of John Churchill, 1st Duke of Marlborough, and Sarah Churchill, Duchess of Marlborough.

Spencer was only seven when his mother died, and he was brought up by his grandmother Sarah, Duchess of Marlborough. He was educated at Eton College in about 1722, and he undertook a Grand Tour through France, Switzerland and Italy between 1725 and 1727. His grandmother determined on a political career for him.

Career
In 1732, Spencer succeeded his cousin, William Godolphin, Marquess of Blandford, as Member of Parliament (MP) for Woodstock, a seat he held until 1746. He was involved in the foundation of the Foundling Hospital, famously championed by Thomas Coram, William Hogarth and others.  Spencer is listed alongside these gentlemen as one of the organisation's founding governors.

In mid-January 1733/4, Spencer inherited his father's family's estates in Bedfordshire, Northamptonshire (including Althorp) and Warwickshire and his grandmother, the Duchess of Marlborough's property, including Wimbledon Park.

Personal life
On 14 February 1733/4, a month after inheriting his family's estates, he married Georgiana Caroline Carteret (the third daughter and co-heir of Viscount Carteret, later Earl Granville). The couple were the parents of two children, one son and one daughter: 

 John Spencer, who was later created Earl Spencer in 1765. 
 Diana Spencer, who died at eight years old.

Spencer died in 1746, three years after their daughter. After his death, his widow remarried four years later to the 2nd Earl Cowper. The Althorp estate remains the seat of the earls, but the Wimbledon estate was later sold by the 4th Earl in 1846.

Ancestry

References

R.H. Nichols and F A. Wray, The History of the Foundling Hospital (London: Oxford University Press, 1935), p. 351.

1708 births
1746 deaths
People educated at Eton College
Younger sons of earls
Members of the Parliament of Great Britain for English constituencies
John Spencer
British MPs 1734–1741
British MPs 1741–1747